The moonlighter (Tilodon sexfasciatus), is a species of marine ray-finned fish, a member of the subfamily Microcanthinae, part of the sea chub family Kyphosidae. Juveniles are found in much shallower waters of coves and estuaries. This species grows to  TL. This fish is commercially important and can also be found in the aquarium trade. This species is the only known member of the genus Tilodon.

References

Microcanthinae
Fish described in 1842